The 2008 Star Mazda Championship was a season of the open wheel racing series the Star Mazda Championship. It consisted of a 12-race schedule beginning in March and ending in October, with only the best eleven race results counting towards the championship. As with 2007, the series featured races exclusively on road and street courses. In addition to the main championship that is typically tested by young, developing drivers, there were also additional class titles for older drivers.

John Edwards won the championship ahead of Joel Miller and Peter Dempsey despite missing the first round of the championship. Edwards won four races, the same as Dempsey, but Dempsey had three finishes of 20th or worse, one of which counted in his points total, while Edwards worst points-scoring finish was 4th. Miller won only once, in the season opener. Noted British drivers Charles Hall and Tom Gladdis also participated in the series and finished fifth and sixth in points, respectively. Each won a single race. British driver Richard Kent won the final race of the season in his series debut, despite not being registered for the championship. Notable international female drivers Natalia Kowalska and Michele Bumgarner also competed in the series despite not being registered for the championship.

Chris Cumming won the Expert class for drivers 30 and older and Chuck Hulse won the Masters class championship for drivers 40 and older.

Race calendar and results

Championship standings

Driver's

Note: Expert and Masters classes have different point system than the overall championship.

References

External links
 Star Mazda Championship Official website
 Star Mazda Racing Teams

Star Mazda Championship
Indy Pro 2000 Championship